Stratonice (Ancient Greek: Στρατoνίκη from  "army" and  "victory") is the name of four women in Greek mythology.

 Stratonice, a Pleuronian princess as the daughter of King Pleuron and Xanthippe. She was the sister of Agenor, Sterope and Laophonte.
Stratonice, a Calydonian princess. The wife of Melaneus and the mother the famous archer Eurytus.
 Stratonice, daughter of Euonymos and mother of Poemander by Chaeresilaus. She was carried off by Achilles.
Stratonice, a Thespian princess as one of the 50 daughters of King Thespius and Megamede or by one of his many wives. When Heracles hunted and ultimately slayed the Cithaeronian lion, Stratonice with her other sisters, except for one, all laid with the hero in a night, a week or for 50 days as what their father strongly desired it to be. Stratonice bore Heracles a son, Atromus.

Notes

References 

 Apollodorus, The Library with an English Translation by Sir James George Frazer, F.B.A., F.R.S. in 2 Volumes, Cambridge, MA, Harvard University Press; London, William Heinemann Ltd. 1921. ISBN 0-674-99135-4. Online version at the Perseus Digital Library. Greek text available from the same website.

 Athenaeus of Naucratis, The Deipnosophists or Banquet of the Learned. London. Henry G. Bohn, York Street, Covent Garden. 1854. Online version at the Perseus Digital Library.
 Athenaeus of Naucratis, Deipnosophistae. Kaibel. In Aedibus B.G. Teubneri. Lipsiae. 1887. Greek text available at the Perseus Digital Library.
 Diodorus Siculus, The Library of History translated by Charles Henry Oldfather. Twelve volumes. Loeb Classical Library. Cambridge, Massachusetts: Harvard University Press; London: William Heinemann, Ltd. 1989. Vol. 3. Books 4.59–8. Online version at Bill Thayer's Web Site
 Diodorus Siculus, Bibliotheca Historica. Vol 1-2. Immanel Bekker. Ludwig Dindorf. Friedrich Vogel. in aedibus B. G. Teubneri. Leipzig. 1888-1890. Greek text available at the Perseus Digital Library.

Hesiod, Catalogue of Women from Homeric Hymns, Epic Cycle, Homerica translated by Evelyn-White, H G. Loeb Classical Library Volume 57. London: William Heinemann, 1914. Online version at theoi.com
Lucius Mestrius Plutarchus, Moralia with an English Translation by Frank Cole Babbitt. Cambridge, MA. Harvard University Press. London. William Heinemann Ltd. 1936. Online version at the Perseus Digital Library. Greek text available from the same website.
 Pausanias, Description of Greece with an English Translation by W.H.S. Jones, Litt.D., and H.A. Ormerod, M.A., in 4 Volumes. Cambridge, MA, Harvard University Press; London, William Heinemann Ltd. 1918. . Online version at the Perseus Digital Library
 Pausanias, Graeciae Descriptio. 3 vols. Leipzig, Teubner. 1903.  Greek text available at the Perseus Digital Library.
Tzetzes, John, Book of Histories, Book II-IV translated by Gary Berkowitz from the original Greek of T. Kiessling's edition of 1826. Online version at theoi.com

Princesses in Greek mythology
Women of Heracles
Aetolian characters in Greek mythology